Günter Hoffmann (born 8 February 1939) is a retired German cyclist. His sporting career began with ASK Vorwärts Leipzig. He competed at the 1964 and 1968 Summer Olympics in the 100 km team time trial and finished in 14th and 13th place, respectively. In 1964 he also finished 78th in the Olympic road race and second in the Peace Race.

Hoffmann was part of the group of athletes who launched in 2012 the "Initiative for Peace in the World".

References 

1939 births
Living people
Cyclists at the 1964 Summer Olympics
Cyclists at the 1968 Summer Olympics
Olympic cyclists of the United Team of Germany
Olympic cyclists of East Germany
East German male cyclists
Sportspeople from Guben
Cyclists from Brandenburg
People from Bezirk Cottbus